Codorus may refer to:

Codorus Creek, in York County, Pennsylvania
Codorus State Park, in York County, Pennsylvania
Codorus Township, York County, Pennsylvania
North Codorus Township, York County, Pennsylvania